Masnada may refer to:
 Masnada or Condottieri, Italian mercenary leader
 Fausto Masnada,  Italian cyclist
 Florence Masnada, French alpine skier